Oxyrhopus melanogenys, commonly known as Tschudi's false coral snake, is a colubrid snake species found in the northern part of South America.

Description

Dorsally, it is red or reddish brown, with the dorsal scales black-edged or black-tipped. There may be a few black crossbands in groups of three (triads) on the anterior portion of the body. The top of the head and the nape of the neck are black. Ventrally, it is yellowish. It is often confused with Oxyrhopus trigeminus.

The dorsal scales are smooth, with apical pits, and are arranged in 19 rows at midbody.

Subspecies
There are two subspecies, including the nominate subspecies:
Oxyrhopus melanogenys melanogenys (Tschudi, 1845)
Oxyrhopus melanogenys orientalis Cunha & Nascimento, 1983

Geographic range
O. m. melanogenys is native to Bolivia, Peru, Brazil (Rondônia, Amazonas, Pará), Ecuador, Colombia, Guyana, Venezuela (Amazonas, Bolívar).

O. m. orientalis is found in Peru and Brazil (Pará).

References

Further reading
Cunha, O.R. da, and F.P. do Nascimento. 1983. Os Ofidios da Amazônia. XIX. As espécies de Oxyrhopus Wagler, com uma subespécie nova, e Pseudoboa Schneider, na Amazônia orientale e Maranhão (Ophidia: Colubridae). Boletim do Museu Paraense Emílio Goeldi, Nova Série, Zoologia (112): 1-42. (Oxyrhopus melanogenys orientalis)
Tschudi, J.J. 1845. Reptilium conspectus quae in Republica Peruana reperiuntur et pleraque observata vel collecta sunt in itinere. Archiv für Naturgeshichte 11 (1): 150–170. (Sphenocephalus melanogenys, p. 163.)

Oxyrhopus
Snakes of South America
Reptiles of Bolivia
Reptiles of Brazil
Reptiles of Colombia
Reptiles of Ecuador
Reptiles of Peru
Reptiles of Venezuela
Reptiles described in 1845
Taxa named by Johann Jakob von Tschudi